The 1985–86 Divizia B was the 46th season of the second tier of the Romanian football league system.

The format has been maintained to three series, each of them having 18 teams. At the end of the season the winners of the series promoted to Divizia A and the last four places from each series relegated to Divizia C.

Team changes

To Divizia B
Promoted from Divizia C
 Minerul Vatra Dornei
 Aripile Bacău
 Delta Tulcea
 Dunărea Călărași
 ICSIM București
 Muscelul Câmpulung
 Electroputere Craiova
 Metalul Bocșa
 Înfrățirea Oradea
 CIL Sighetu Marmației
 Mecanica Orăștie
 ICIM Brașov

Relegated from Divizia A
 Jiul Petroșani
 Baia Mare
 Politehnica Iași

From Divizia B
Relegated to Divizia C
 FEPA 74 Bârlad
 Metalul București
 Metalurgistul Cugir
 Metalul Mangalia
 Unirea Alexandria
 Sticla Arieșul Turda
 Partizanul Bacău
 Autobuzul București
 Gloria Reșița
 Unirea Dinamo Focșani
 Minerul Motru
 IS Câmpia Turzii

Promoted to Divizia A
 Petrolul Ploiești
 Dinamo Victoria București
 Universitatea Cluj

Renamed teams
CSM Drobeta-Turnu Severin was renamed as AS Drobeta-Turnu Severin.

FC Baia Mare was renamed as FC Maramureș Baia Mare.

Flacăra-Automecanica Moreni was renamed as Flacăra Moreni.

IP Aluminiu Slatina was renamed as Sportul Muncitoresc Slatina.

League tables

Serie I

Serie II

Serie III

See also 
 1985–86 Divizia A

References

Liga II seasons
Romania
2